Sariñena is a municipality in the province of Huesca, Aragon, Spain. It is located in the Monegros comarca, near the Sierra de Alcubierre range.

The Baroque monastery of Nuestra Señora de las Fuentes is located in the municipal term.

Villages
Sariñena town
La Cartuja de Monegros
Lastanosa
La Masadera
Pallaruelo de Monegros
San Juan del Flumen

Twin towns
 Mézin, France

References

External links 

Sariñena in Pueblos-España.org
Sariñena in AragonEsAsi.com
Saridigital, news about Sariñena

Municipalities in the Province of Huesca